Benadir University (BU), also known as the University of Benadir, is a private university located in Mogadishu, Somalia.

History
Benadir University was founded in October 2002 as a medical school to help train local doctors in Somalia.

On December 28, 2019, a bomb attack destroyed a minibus carrying Benadir University students, killing at least 76 people including 20 Benadir University students.

See also
2009 Shamo Hotel bombing

References

Benadir University

External links
 Benadir University

Universities in Somalia
Universities in Mogadishu
Educational institutions established in 2002
2002 establishments in Somalia